Prosper Higiro (born 28 January 1961) is a Rwandan politician and member of the Liberal Party as its official chairperson. Since 10 October 2004, Prosper has been a Senator and Vice-President of the Senate representing the Kirehe District in the Eastern Province. Prosper has worked extensively in the Ministry of Commerce, Industry and Handcraft. He is also a member of the Pan-African Parliament.  In the 2010 Presidential election he gained 1.37% of the vote, coming third.

References

External links
 Official government biography

1961 births
Living people
Members of the Senate (Rwanda)
Members of the Pan-African Parliament from Rwanda
People from Eastern Province, Rwanda
Liberal Party (Rwanda) politicians